Dr. Ka. Kaliaperumal (19 August 1937 – 8 July 2011) was born in the plantation of Kampar Estate near the town of Kampar in Perak, Malaysia. He is one of Malaysia's senior Tamil writers. He is the author of more than 80 Malaysian Tamil School books. He is the author of 100 over books on Tamil Grammar and Literature. He gave a formal Structure to Tamil Rituals in Malaysia.

He was awarded the “Tamilkuyilar” accolade by Pavender Bharathidasan in the 1960s. He lived with the honour until his last breath.

He created the compendium of Global Tamilar Culture. He received The Tokoh Guru Award, the Perak State Sultan Award, and the Teachers' Association's Thondamani Award. He received his doctor of Literature from the World University Roundtable, Arizona, U.S.A in 1989.

As a writer 
His first work was published in 1953 in the Tamil Murasu Maanavar Manimandram Magazine in Malaysia. He has authored more than 200 short stories, over 500 articles, and more than 300 poems, texts and plays. His work has been published in Malaysian national newspapers and weekly magazines. He has written a series of articles and questionnaires in Malaysian national newspapers on language, religion and society.

The Malaysian Nanban daily wrote a question-and-answer section called “Bakthiyum Paguttharivum” (Devotion and Rationality).

Tamilkuyil 
He successfully ran the “Tamilkuyil” and “Aasiriyar Ohli” magazine.

Malaysian Tamil Writers National Conference 
In 1982, he created the "National Conference of Malaysian Tamil Writers" to unite with the state-wide Tamil Writers' Societies and Malaysian writers.

He served as the President of the Federation of Malaysian Writers' Societies. He is also the proud president of the State Writers Association of Perak State.

Public Works 
He led the Tamil Aasiriyar Society and founded Vallalar Anbu Nilaiyam in Ipoh.

Books 

 Adipadai Tamil
 Chiruvar Sentamizh Kalaigiam
 Tamilar Thirumanam Muraigal
 Nittarkadan Neri Murigal
 Phonmani Sinthanaigal
 Tamilar Panpatu Kalaigiam (a collection of more than 1000 pages)

And many more books.

Prizes and awards 
He led the Tamil Aasiriyar Society and founded Vallalar Anbu Nilaiyam in Ipoh.

 Perak State Educational Portfolio 'Toko Guru' Award
 'Thondarmani' Award from the National Association of Teachers of Malaysia Tamil School
 Penang Fellow Artist of the Year award
 Kuala Lumpur Tamil Sangam Award 'Thirukkural Mamani'
 Malaysian Tamil Writers Association “Thaninyayaka Adigal”Award
 Malaysian Swamy Spirit Award for 'Tamil Nerikuyil' Award
 Tamil Nesan 'Bowen Prize'
 Malaysian Tamil Writers Association
 'Ketaiye Parisu' presented by Malaysian Tamil Writers' Association
 'Ketaiye Parisu' presented by Swami Rama Dasar
 “Sentamizh Semmal” Awarded by Swami Kripananda Varior
 'Senthhamizhi Vanar' Award - Awarded by Sithiyavan Thiruvalluvar Studios
 'Thirukkural Mani' award - presented at the Raup Tamilar Sangam on Silver Festival
 'Tamil Neri Kavalar' award, received from – Chennai Chilampu Selvar the Minister of Education
 PJK Award by the Sultan of Perak
 AMP award by the Sultan of Perak
 Bhavender Bharathidasan 'Tamilkulyar' award

References 

 “Kural Kuurum Natpudaimai,” Malainitigal, Ipoh, 1958 (5 articles)
 “Ilakkiatthil Uulvinai,” Janobagari, Kuala Lumpur, 1958
 “Nilanuul Vilakkam,” Janobagari, Kuala Lumpur, 1959 (17 articles)
 “Santhiramandala Tamilanukku Kaditham,” Latchiam, Ipoh, 1962 (7 articles) “Samayatyhuraiyil Sambanthan,” Kuuturavu, Kuala Lumpur, 1965
 “Naan Kanda Sennai,” Manogaran, Singapore, 1965 (7 articles)
 “Thennatu Gandhi – Thiru Vika,” Tamilkuyil, Ipoh, 1966
 “Naadagakkalai,” Tamilkuyil, Ipoh, 1966
 “Malaysiavil Thamilargal Nilai,” Tamilkuyil, Ipoh, 1966
 “Varalaatril Thiruvilaakkal,” Souvenir Programme of Kuantan Mariamman Temple, Kuantan, 1967
 “Malaysiyavil Eluthu Sirthirutham,” Proceedings of the 6th World Tamil Language Research Conference, Kuala Lumpur, 1986
 “Arutperum Jothi,” Proceedings of the 6th World Tamil Language Research Conference, Kuala Lumpur, 1986
 “Thunukku’ Thoranangal,” Tamil Nesan, Kuala Lumpur, 1988 (Over a 100 articles)
 “Malaysia Tamil Elakkia Varalaru,” Souvenir Magazine, Christian Tamil Writers Association Ipoh, 1990
 “Malaysia Thesiyathukku,” Proceedings of 7th World Tamil Language Research Conference, Chennai, 1990
 “Paaventhar Kanda Paappa,” Special Malaysian Issue for the 7th World Tamil Language Research Conference, 1991
 “Pandaithamilar Panpaadu,” Kepala Batas Vinayagar Temple Souvenir Programme, Kepala Batas, 1992
 “Vaalviyal Panpaattil Tamil,” Proceedings of 12th World Tamil Language Research Conference, Kuala Lumpur, 1992
 “Valikaattum Kural,” Mayil, Kuala Lumpur, 1993 (16 articles)
 “Bakthiyum Pagutharivum,” Malaysia Nanban,1998-2000 (100 articles)

External links 

Kaliaperumal Kavithaigal
 Dr.K.Kaliaperumal on Prezi
Tamil Kuyil Dr.K.Kaliaperumal on tamilarthesiam.org
Tamilkuyil Dr.K.Kaliaperumal on prezi.com

2011 deaths
1937 births